Innovative Concepts in Entertainment, abbreviated as ICE, is an American electronic game and redemption game manufacturing company based in Clarence, New York, United States. The company was founded in 1982 and has since become the leader of the North American market. The company was previously owned by MidMark Capital and Summer Street Capital Partners, but was sold back to the original owners in June 2008. The company, along with their redemption games, manufacture claw games and pinball.

History
Innovative Concepts in Entertainment was founded in 1982 by Ralph Coppola. In 1982, the company created Chexx, which thrust them into popularity. They would continue to proudce redemption games, and later produce the game Cyclone in 1995, which became even more successful. The success of Cyclone and the tactics in its design would greatly change the redemption game industry. Its design would be replicated and tactics copied. In the 1990s, ICE expanded to the crane game market, and by the mid-1990s became a leader in the industry as it rebounded in popularity.

During the COVID-19 pandemic, the company struggled to stay afloat due to New York's lockdown laws. However, they survived by creating a new website to appealing to men trying to create a man cave.

References

1982 establishments in New York (state)